Ingram Creek, originally Arroyo de la Suerte, is a  tributary of the San Joaquin River in Stanislaus County, in the San Joaquin Valley of California.

The upper reach of the creek runs through Ingram Canyon. Its headwaters are in the Diablo Range. It is a western tributary of the San Joaquin River.

Geology
Ingram Creek eroded from the following formations; the Franciscan Assemblage, Mesozoic ultrabasic intrusive rocks, and marine sediments of Upper Cretaceous, Paleocene and Eocene age.  Marine sediments have been leached by groundwater, causing an elevated concentration of brine in the groundwater at depths of approximately 600 feet.

See also
Hospital Creek

References

Rivers of Stanislaus County, California
Tributaries of the San Joaquin River
Diablo Range
Geography of the San Joaquin Valley
Rivers of Northern California